Drazanda (also spelled Darazinda or Drazinda) is a main village or small town in Dera Ismail Khan District, Khyber Pakhtunkhwa province, Pakistan. The population is 8,842 according to the 2017 Census of Pakistan.

References

Populated places in Dera Ismail Khan District